The Budapest Formula 2 round is a FIA Formula 2 Championship series race that is run on the Hungaroring track in Mogyoród, Hungary.

Winners

See also
 Hungarian Grand Prix
 Hungaroring GP2 round
 Budapest Formula 3 round
 Hungaroring GP3 round

References

FIA Formula 2 Championship